The classical albedo features of Mars are the light and dark features that can be seen on the planet Mars through an Earth-based telescope. Before the age of space probes, several astronomers created maps of Mars on which they gave names to the features they could see. The most popular system of nomenclature was devised by Giovanni Schiaparelli, who used names from classical antiquity. Today, the improved understanding of Mars enabled by space probes has rendered many of the classical names obsolete for the purposes of cartography; however, some of the old names are still used to describe geographical features on the planet.

History

Observing albedo features 

Early telescopic astronomers, observing Mars from a great distance through primitive instruments (though they were advanced for their day), were limited to studying albedo contrasts on the surface of the planet. These lighter and darker patches rarely correspond to topographic features and in many cases obscure them. The origins of the albedo contrasts were a mystery. The lighter patches at the poles were correctly believed to be a frozen substance, either water or carbon dioxide, but the nature of the dark patches seen against the general reddish tint of Mars was uncertain for centuries. When Giovanni Schiaparelli began observing Mars in 1877, he believed that the darker features were seas, lakes, and swamps and named them accordingly in Latin (mare, lacus, palus etc.). Within a few decades, however, most astronomers came to agree that Mars lacks large bodies of surface water. The dark features were then thought by some to be indications of Martian vegetation, since they changed shape and intensity over the course of the Martian year. They are now known to be areas where the wind has swept away the paler dust, exposing a darker surface, often basaltic rock; so their borders change in response to windstorms on the Martian surface that move the dust around, widening or narrowing the features.

The dust-storms themselves also appear as light patches, can cover vast areas and sometimes last for many weeks; when Mariner 9 arrived in Martian orbit in November 1971 the entire planet was covered by a single enormous dust-storm, with only the peaks of the four or five highest mountains showing above it. This variability may explain many of the differences between telescopic observations over the years.

Early non-classical names 

The first map of Martian albedo features was published in 1840 by Johann Heinrich Mädler and Wilhelm Beer, but they simply labelled the features a, b, c ... without giving them names. Over the next two decades the most prominent features picked up various informal names (such as the Hourglass Sea for our Syrtis Major Planum) but there was no overall system.

The first astronomer to name Martian albedo features systematically was Richard A. Proctor, who in 1867 created a map (based in part on the observations of William Rutter Dawes) in which several features were given the names of astronomers who had been involved in mapping Mars. In some cases, the same names were used for multiple features. Proctor's names remained in use for several decades, notably in several early maps drawn by Camille Flammarion in 1876 and Nathaniel Green in 1877.

Schiaparelli's classical names 

However, within a few decades Proctor's names were superseded by a new scheme devised by Giovanni Schiaparelli, whose observations differed from Proctor's, and who used this difference to justify drawing up an entirely new system of nomenclature. Schiaparelli was an expert on ancient astronomy and geography, and used Latin names, drawn from the myths, history and geography of classical antiquity; dark features were named after ancient seas and rivers, light areas after islands and legendary lands.

When E. M. Antoniadi took over as the leading telescopic observer of Mars in the early 20th century, he followed Schiaparelli's names rather than Proctor's, and the  Proctorian names quickly became obsolete. In his encyclopedic work La Planète Mars (1930) Antoniadi used all Schiaparelli's names and added more of his own from the same classical sources. However, there was still no 'official' system of names for Martian features.

In 1958, the International Astronomical Union set up an ad hoc committee under Audouin Dollfus, which settled on a list of 128 officially recognised albedo features. Of these, 105 came from Schiaparelli, 2 from Flammarion, 2 from Percival Lowell, and 16 from Antoniadi, with an additional 3 from the committee itself. This involved a considerable amount of pruning; Antoniadi's La Planète Mars had mentioned 558 named features.

The pictures returned by interplanetary spacecraft, notably the observations made from Martian orbit by Mariner 9 over the course of 1972, have revolutionized the scientific understanding of Mars, and some of the classical albedo features have become obsolete as they do not correspond clearly with the detailed images provided by the spacecraft. However, many of the names used for topographic features on Mars are still based on the classical nomenclature for the feature's location; for instance, the albedo feature 'Ascraeus Lacus' provides the basis of the name of the volcano Ascraeus Mons in roughly the same position.

In addition, since most Earth-based amateur telescopes are not powerful enough to resolve the topographic surface features of Mars, amateur astronomers still use many of the old feature-names to orient themselves and record their observations.

Common feature names

Several Latin words involved here are common nouns. These are generally, but not always, second in the name, but are usually ignored in alphabetizing below:

 Campi – fields
 Cherso – peninsula
 Cornu – horn, peninsula
 Depressio – lowland
 Fastigium – summit
 Fons – fountain
 Fretum – strait
 Insula – island
 Lacus – lake
 Lucus – grove
 Mare – sea
 Nix – snow
 Palus – marsh
 Pons – bridge
 Promontorium – cape
 Regio – region
 Silva – wood
 Sinus – bay

List of albedo features
Not listed here are the "canals" also observed and named by Schiaparelli, for which see the article Martian canals.

Note that the pronunciation refers to English pronunciation, not Latin or Italian.

A

B-E

F-L

M-N

O-S

T-Z

Interactive Mars map

See also 

 Aspledon Undae
 Dark dune spots
 List of craters on Mars
 List of Martian canals
 Mars
 Martian canals
 Siton Undae

References

Further reading

External links
USGS Astrologeology Program, Martian Nomenclature